Behrensia is a genus of moths of the family Noctuidae.

Species
 Behrensia bicolor McDunnough, 1941
 Behrensia conchiformis Grote, 1875

References
 Behrensia  at Markku Savela's Lepidoptera and Some Other Life Forms
 Natural History Museum Lepidoptera genus database

Cuculliinae